Bhudiar Muhammad Riza (born 23 May 1995) is an Indonesian professional footballer who plays as a full-back for Liga 1 club Dewa United.

Club career

Persijap Jepara
Riza signed with Persijap Jepara to play in the Indonesian Liga 2 for the 2020 season. This season was suspended on 27 March 2020 due to the COVID-19 pandemic. The season was abandoned and was declared void on 20 January 2021.

Dewa United
In 2021, Riza signed a contract with Indonesian Liga 2 club Dewa United. He made his league debut on 28 September against RANS Cilegon at the Gelora Bung Karno Madya Stadium, Jakarta.

Career statistics

Club

Notes

References

External links
 Bhudiar Riza at Soccerway
 Bhudiar Riza at Liga Indonesia

1995 births
Living people
Indonesian footballers
Association football defenders
People from Wonogiri Regency
Sportspeople from Central Java
Liga 1 (Indonesia) players
Liga 2 (Indonesia) players
Kalteng Putra F.C. players
Persijap Jepara players
Dewa United F.C. players